Deborah A. Prentice is a scholar of psychology and a university administrator. She serves as provost at Princeton University and Alexander Stewart 1886 Professor of Psychology and Public Affairs. In October 2022, following approval by the university's Regent House she was appointed next Vice-Chancellor of the University of Cambridge.

Education
Prentice graduated with an A.B. in human biology and music from Stanford University in 1984. She then pursued graduate studies at Yale University, where she received an M.S. in psychology in 1986, an M.Phil. in psychology in 1987, and a Ph.D. in psychology in 1989.

Career
Prentice began at Princeton in 1988, becoming assistant professor in 1989. Prior to becoming provost on July 1, 2017, Prentice served as Dean of the Faculty from 2014 to 2017. 

Her research focuses on social norms. Her pioneering work on pluralistic ignorance applied to college campus alcohol use is a foundation of numerous campus alcohol education and bystander intervention programs.

Personal life
Prentice is married with three children.

Works
"Pluralistic ignorance and alcohol use on campus: Some consequences of misperceiving the social norm" with D.T. Miller, Journal of Personality and Social Psychology. 64(2): 243–256. doi:10.1037/0022-3514.64.2.243 http://psycnet.apa.org/doiLanding?doi=10.1037%2F0022-3514.64.2.243
"What women and men should be, shouldn't be, are allowed to be, and don't have to be: The contents of prescriptive gender stereotypes" with E. Carranza, Psychology of Women Quarterly, 26 (2002), 269–281.
 "Essentializing differences between women and men" with D.T. Miller, Psychological Science, 17 (2006), 129–135.
 (2006). "On the distinction between acting like an individual and feeling like an individual" in T. Postmes & J. Jetten (eds.) Individuality and the Group: Advances in Social Identity (37–55). (Sage Publications, 2006).
 "Mobilizing and weakening peer influence as mechanisms for changing behavior: Implications for alcohol intervention programs" in M. J. Prinstein & K. A. Dodge (eds.) Understanding Peer Influence in Children and Adolescents (161–180). (Guilford, 2008).
 "The psychology of social norms and the promotion of human rights" in R. Goodman, D. Jinks, & A. K. Woods (eds.), Understanding Social Action, Promoting Human Rights (Oxford University Press, in press).

References

Living people
Princeton University faculty
Year of birth missing (living people)